Longton is a city in Elk County, Kansas, United States, along the Elk River.  As of the 2020 census, the population of the city was 288.

History
Longton was founded in 1870. It was named after Longton, England.

The first post office in Longton was established in August, 1870.

Geography
Longton is located at  (37.377499, -96.082832).

Climate
The climate in this area is characterized by hot, humid summers and generally mild to cool winters.  According to the Köppen Climate Classification system, Longton has a humid subtropical climate, abbreviated "Cfa" on climate maps.

Demographics

2010 census
As of the census of 2010, there were 348 people, 147 households, and 97 families residing in the city. The racial makeup of the city was 94.3% White, 1.4% Native American, 1.4% from other races, and 2.9% from two or more races. Hispanic or Latino of any race were 4.0% of the population.

There were 147 households, of which 34.7% had children under the age of 18 living with them, 46.3% were married couples living together, 13.6% had a female householder with no husband present, 6.1% had a male householder with no wife present, and 34.0% were non-families. 32.0% of all households were made up of individuals, and 19% had someone living alone who was 65 years of age or older. The average household size was 2.37 and the average family size was 2.93.

The median age in the city was 38.3 years. 29.6% of residents were under the age of 18; 7.5% were between the ages of 18 and 24; 22.4% were from 25 to 44; 23.2% were from 45 to 64; and 17.2% were 65 years of age or older. The gender makeup of the city was 50.3% male and 49.7% female.

2000 census
As of the census of 2000, there were 394 people, 163 households, and 98 families residing in the city. The racial makeup of the city was 94.67% White, 2.28% Native American, 0.25% Pacific Islander, 0.76% from other races, and 2.03% from two or more races. Hispanic or Latino of any race were 3.30% of the population.

There were 163 households, out of which 35.0% had children under the age of 18 living with them, 44.8% were married couples living together, 10.4% had a female householder with no husband present, and 39.3% were non-families. 38.0% of all households were made up of individuals, and 24.5% had someone living alone who was 65 years of age or older. The average household size was 2.42 and the average family size was 3.25.

In the city, the population was spread out, with 32.0% under the age of 18, 7.6% from 18 to 24, 21.3% from 25 to 44, 20.6% from 45 to 64, and 18.5% who were 65 years of age or older. The median age was 36 years. For every 100 females, there were 87.6 males. For every 100 females age 18 and over, there were 84.8 males.

The median income for a household in the city was $20,469, and the median income for a family was $29,625. Males had a median income of $23,750 versus $16,477 for females. The per capita income for the city was $10,802. About 13.9% of families and 20.1% of the population were below the poverty line, including 23.9% of those under age 18 and 23.9% of those age 65 or over.

References

Further reading

External links
 City of Longton
 Longton - Directory of Public Officials
 USD 283, local school district
 Longton city map, KDOT

Cities in Kansas
Cities in Elk County, Kansas